Brouchaud is a commune in the Dordogne department in southwestern France.

Geography
The small rivers Soue and Blâme join near Brouchaud.

Population

See also
Communes of the Dordogne department

References

Communes of Dordogne